The Fireworks Regulations 2004 impose restrictions on the importation, supply and possession of fireworks in England, Wales and Scotland. The regulations were made under the Fireworks Act 2003.
In particular, the Regulations introduced the following measures:

 a ban on the use of fireworks late at night (after 11 pm) - except for New Year's Eve, the night of Diwali and the first day of Chinese New Year - where fireworks may be used until 1 am (on Guy Fawkes Night fireworks may be used until 12 midnight); 
 a ban on the possession of Category 4 fireworks by non-professionals; 
 a ban on persons under the age of 18 possessing fireworks in public places; 
 a ban on the sale of fireworks outside certain "traditional" or minority-cultural periods (such as those listed in the first bullet), unless suppliers are licensed; and, 
 a requirement that importers of fireworks notify HM Revenue and Customs of the storage destination of their imports - the intention being to prevent illegal distribution and dangerous storage.

Some of these regulations are not applicable to Scotland, and none of them applies in Northern Ireland, which has its own, stricter regulations in place. The regulations revoked the Fireworks Regulations 2003 which introduced, as emergency measures, prohibitions on the possession of fireworks by those under the age of 18 and the possession of category 4 fireworks by non-professionals. UK emergency regulations are usually temporary in nature - lasting no more than one year after the date of coming into force.

The Department for Business, Energy and Industrial Strategy (BEIS) is responsible for fireworks policy.

References

Statutory Instruments of the United Kingdom
2004 in British law
Fireworks